Alpha Delta Sigma began as a men's honorary fraternity in the field of advertising.

The Fraternity appears to have fairly quickly repositioned itself as a men's national professional advertising fraternity, with some chapters providing housing for members. As such it joined the Professional Fraternity Association in 1928 as a charter member.

Alpha Delta Sigma merged with Gamma Alpha Chi, which had also been formed  at University of Missouri as a female counterpart to Alpha Delta Sigma. In 1964, Alpha Delta Sigma had 50 undergraduate and 11 professional chapters and Gamma Alpha Chi had 37 chapters of which 22 were active.

The merged fraternity was headquartered, briefly, at Texas Tech University. In 1973, the combined fraternity, still named  and often just "ADS", itself finally merged into the American Advertising Federation.  Today the AAF continues to use the name Alpha Delta Sigma for its collegiate programs and as a subsidiary national honor society for the field.

Symbols and traditions
The colors of the Fraternity were red and white.
The pin was a shield, with the image of the Western Hemisphere at bottom, surmounted by the three Greek letters of its name.
Chapters were named for prominent members of the field, prominent alumni or members of a  host school's faculty.

References

Honor societies
Student organizations established in 1913
1913 establishments in Missouri
Former members of Professional Fraternity Association